Malaysian South Korean or South Korean Malaysian may refer to:
Malaysians in South Korea
South Koreans in Malaysia
Malaysia–South Korea relations
Multiracial people of Malaysian and South Korean descent